Jeanne Brolliet (died 1623) was a Genevan woman who was executed for witchcraft.

She is known as the last person to be burned at the stake for witchcraft in the city of Geneva. She was, however, not the last person to be executed for sorcery in Geneva: the last person to be executed for sorcery in Geneva was Michée Chauderon, but she was not executed by burning.

References

17th-century people
Witch trials in the Republic of Geneva
People executed for witchcraft
1623 deaths
People executed by burning